Paden is a town in Okfuskee County, Oklahoma, United States. The population was 461 at the 2010 census. It is named for Paden Tolbert, a U.S. Deputy Marshal who served the area in the early 1900s.

Geography
Paden, in east central Oklahoma, is located at  (35.507287, -96.568516).

The ghost town of Micawber, Oklahoma, which disappeared in the 1930s (only the Micawber Cemetery remains), is north-northeast of Paden and in Paden’s zip code.

Demographics

As of the census of 2010, there were 461 people, 199 households, and 134 families residing in the town. There were 234 housing units at an average density of 510.9 per square mile (197.3/km2). The racial makeup of the town was 54.68% White, 37.70% Native American, and 7.62% from two or more races. Hispanic or Latino of any race were 0.90% of the population.

There were 199 households, out of which 27.6% had children under the age of 18 living with them, 45.7% were married couples living together, 16.6% had a female householder with no husband present, and 32.7% were non-families. 30.2% of all households were made up of individuals, and 14.6% had someone living alone who was 65 years of age or older. The average household size was 2.32 and the average family size was 2.81.

In the town, the population was spread out, with 25.0% under the age of 18, 8.5% from 18 to 24, 28.5% from 25 to 44, 19.7% from 45 to 64, and 15.7% who were 65 years of age or older. The median age was 35 years. For every 100 females, there were 89.0 males. For every 100 females age 18 and over, there were 85.6 males.

The median income for a household in the town was $27,321, and the median income for a family was $31,250. Males had a median income of $24,444 versus $20,972 for females. The per capita income for the town was $12,444. About 7.1% of families and 9.0% of the population were below the poverty line, including 10.2% of those under age 18 and 12.7% of those age 65 or over.

Notable people

 Ed Baecht, former major league baseball player, was born in Paden.
 Dan Boren, former U.S. Congressman, was born in Shawnee, Oklahoma but later made Paden his home.

References

Towns in Okfuskee County, Oklahoma
Towns in Oklahoma